The Community College of Rhode Island (CCRI) is a public community college in Rhode Island.  It is the only community college in the state and the largest community college in New England. The college's primary facility is located in Warwick, with additional college buildings throughout the state.

History
It was founded as Rhode Island Junior College, "RIJC", in 1964 with 325 students studying at the Henry Barnard School in Providence, Rhode Island. In 1965, a portion of the nearby former Brown & Sharpe manufacturing facility was converted into classroom space and served as the college's primary facility until 1972. The Knight campus in Warwick, RI built on the donated Knight Estate, opened in 1972 as the school's first permanent building and flagship campus. It was followed by three additional campus and 2 satellite locations.

The Margaret M. Jacoby Observatory, located on the Knight Campus grounds, was opened in 1978. The school was renamed the Community College of Rhode Island in June 1980.

Campuses

The college's primary facility is located in Warwick, with additional college buildings throughout the state.

Knight Campus (Warwick, opened in 1972)
Flanagan Campus (Lincoln, opened in 1976)
Liston Campus (Providence, opened in 1990)
Newport County Campus (Newport, opened in 2006)
Downcity Campus-Shephard Building (Providence)
Satellite Campus-Westerly Education Center (Westerly)

Architecture

The college's flagship Knight building in Warwick was designed by the Chicago and New York architecture firm of Perkins & Will, in conjunction with Providence firms Harkness & Geddes and Robinson Green Beretta. The campus was designed to house all academic, social, and recreational functions in a single building. The building itself is an enormous concrete structure which terminates in a semicircle, and ranges in height from four to six stories. The design is a notable example of Brutalist architecture, and was heavily influenced by the philosophy of Le Corbusier. The building was hailed by the Rhode Island Historical Preservation Commission as "one of the most striking and innovative contemporary structures in the state" when it opened in 1972.

Over time, the Brutalist style generally lost its appeal and became seen as "drab," "hulking," and "bureaucratic," associated with large-scale mass-planning. In 2019, the Knight campus building made local news after being named "eighth ugliest college campus in the United States" by a lifestyle blog.

Academic profile 
The college offers the following degrees:

Associate in Arts (A.A.)
Associate in Science (A.S.)
Associate in Applied Science (A.A.S.)
Associate in Applied Science in Technical Studies (A.A.S.-T.S.)
Associate in Fine Arts (A.F.A.)

Several one-year certificates are also awarded.

Student life 
The school's student newspaper is The Unfiltered Lens, which began publication in 2007. It replaced the Knightly News, which had been active in the 1980s, but had become defunct several years prior to the Lens' founding.

Sport 
The college athletics teams are nicknamed the Knights.

Noted people

Alumni
 Alex Owumi - Former professional basketball player
 Rhéal Cormier - Major League Baseball pitcher
 Rebecca Haynes - WNBL basketball player
 Darren Main - yoga teacher and author
 Ken McDonald - NCAA basketball coach
Cynthia Mendes, member of the Rhode Island State Senate
 Joe Polisena, former member of the Rhode Island State Senate
 Tiny the Terrible, professional wrestler and politician 
 Agostinho Silva - former Rhode Island state representative
 JVKE - American singer-songwriter and producer, came to this college for about a year

See also 

 Margaret M. Jacoby Observatory

References

External links 
 

 
Buildings and structures in Newport County, Rhode Island
Buildings and structures in Warwick, Rhode Island
Community colleges in Rhode Island
Education in Kent County, Rhode Island
Education in Newport County, Rhode Island
Educational institutions established in 1964
Universities and colleges in Providence, Rhode Island
1964 establishments in Rhode Island
NJCAA athletics